Horse Fork is a stream in Clinton County in the U.S. state of Missouri.

According to the State Historical Society of Missouri, Horse Fork may have been named for a horse-powered gristmill near its banks.

See also
List of rivers of Missouri

References

Rivers of Clinton County, Missouri
Rivers of Missouri